Alibegović is a surname, derived from Turkish Ali Bey. Notable people with the surname include:

Amar Alibegović (born 1995), Bosnian-Italian basketball player
 (1932-2017), Croatian theater, television and film actress
Dubravka Jurlina Alibegović (born 1963), Croatian economist and politician
 (born 1927), Yugoslav film and theater actor
Nihad Alibegović (born 1962), Bosnian singer
Teoman Alibegović (born 1967), Bosnian-Slovenian basketball player

See also 

 Alibegovići
 Alibegovići

Bosnian surnames